Hazel Mary Tucker (born 1965) is an English-born New Zealand social anthropologist. She is Professor of Tourism at the University of Otago.

Academic career 
Tucker graduated from Durham University, England with a PhD in social anthropology in 1999. She moved to New Zealand in January 2000 to lecture at the University of Otago and was promoted to full professor there, with effect from 1 February 2019.

Selected works

References

External links 

 
 

1965 births
Living people
Academic staff of the University of Otago
Social anthropologists
New Zealand women academics
New Zealand women anthropologists
21st-century New Zealand women writers
Women non-fiction writers
English emigrants to New Zealand
Alumni of Durham University Graduate Society